Aubrey W. Grossman (1911–1999) was a widely known Civil Rights attorney and member of the Communist Party USA. He is best known for his defense of Willie McGee (convict), a black man put to death for an alleged rape, and for his defense of the Native Americans who occupied Alcatraz Island in 1969–71.

Born in California on 29 March 1911, he was the son of David Grossman and his wife Emma (née Silverstein) Grossman.

References

American communists
1911 births
1999 deaths
American civil rights lawyers